East Lynne is a city in eastern Cass County, Missouri  The population was 303 at the 2010 census. It is part of the Kansas City metropolitan area within the United States.

History
East Lynne was platted in 1871. The city took its name from the novel East Lynne by Ellen Wood. A post office has been in operation at East Lynne since 1871.

Geography
East Lynne is located six miles east of Harrisonville on Missouri Route K. The site is on the Missouri–Kansas–Texas Railroad and the St. Louis–San Francisco Railway lines. Gunn City is three miles to the east along the Missouri–Kansas–Texas line. Camp Branch flows past the north side of the community.

Demographics

2010 census
As of the census of 2010, there were 303 people, 107 households, and 75 families living in the city. The racial makeup of the city was 97.4% White, 0.3% African American, 0.3% Native American, and 2.0% from two or more races. Hispanic or Latino of any race were 1.7% of the population.

There were 107 households, of which 42.1% had children under the age of 18 living with them, 49.5% were married couples living together, 15.0% had a female householder with no husband present, 5.6% had a male householder with no wife present, and 29.9% were non-families. 24.3% of all households were made up of individuals, and 12.2% had someone living alone who was 65 years of age or older. The average household size was 2.83 and the average family size was 3.40.

The median age in the city was 31.9 years. 32.3% of residents were under the age of 18; 6% were between the ages of 18 and 24; 29% were from 25 to 44; 19.6% were from 45 to 64; and 13.2% were 65 years of age or older. The gender makeup of the city was 53.1% male and 46.9% female.

2000 census
As of the census of 2000, there were 300 people, 107 households, and 75 families living in the city. The population density was 1,066.9 people per square mile (413.7/km2). There were 115 housing units at an average density of 409.0 per square mile (158.6/km2). The racial makeup of the city was 97.67% White, 0.67% Native American, and 1.67% from two or more races. Hispanic or Latino of any race were 1.00% of the population.

There were 107 households, out of which 42.1% had children under the age of 18 living with them, 57.0% were married couples living together, 5.6% had a female householder with no husband present, and 29.9% were non-families. 25.2% of all households were made up of individuals, and 12.1% had someone living alone who was 65 years of age or older. The average household size was 2.80 and the average family size was 3.40.

In the city, the population was spread out, with 31.7% under the age of 18, 10.0% from 18 to 24, 30.3% from 25 to 44, 16.7% from 45 to 64, and 11.3% who were 65 years of age or older. The median age was 34 years. For every 100 females, there were 101.3 males. For every 100 females age 18 and over, there were 107.1 males.

The median income for a household in the city was $38,472, and the median income for a family was $46,875. Males had a median income of $29,167 versus $21,042 for females. The per capita income for the city was $14,055. About 2.7% of families and 6.1% of the population were below the poverty line, including 5.1% of those under the age of eighteen and 8.3% of those 65 or over.

References

Cities in Cass County, Missouri
Cities in Missouri